Scammon may refer to:

Scammon, Kansas
Scammon (surname)